The following lists events that happened in Argentina in 2018.

Incumbents
President: Mauricio Macri
Vice President: Gabriela Michetti

Governors
Governor of Buenos Aires Province: María Eugenia Vidal 
Governor of Catamarca Province: Lucía Corpacci 
Governor of Chaco Province: Domingo Peppo 
Governor of Chubut Province: Mariano Arcioni
Governor of Córdoba: Juan Schiaretti
Governor of Corrientes Province: Gustavo Valdés
Governor of Entre Ríos Province: Gustavo Bordet
Governor of Formosa Province: Gildo Insfrán
Governor of Jujuy Province: Gerardo Morales
Governor of La Pampa Province: Carlos Verna 
Governor of La Rioja Province: Ricardo Quintela
Governor of Mendoza Province: Alfredo Cornejo 
Governor of Misiones Province: Hugo Passalacqua 
Governor of Neuquén Province: Omar Gutiérrez
Governor of Río Negro Province: Alberto Weretilneck 
Governor of Salta Province: Juan Manuel Urtubey 
Governor of San Juan Province: Sergio Uñac
Governor of San Luis Province: Alberto Rodríguez Saá
Governor of Santa Cruz Province: Alicia Kirchner
Governor of Santa Fe Province: Miguel Lifschitz 
Governor of Santiago del Estero: Gerardo Zamora
Governor of Tierra del Fuego: Rosana Bertone
Governor of Tucumán: Juan Luis Manzur

Vice Governors
Vice Governor of Buenos Aires Province: Daniel Salvador 
Vice Governor of Catamarca Province: Jorge Solá Jais 
Vice Governor of Chaco Province: Daniel Capitanich 
Vice Governor of Corrientes Province: Gustavo Canteros 
Vice Governor of Entre Rios Province: Adán Bahl 
Vice Governor of Formosa Province: vacant 
Vice Governor of Jujuy Province: Carlos Haquim
Vice Governor of La Pampa Province: Mariano Fernández 
Vice Governor of La Rioja Province: Néstor Bosetti 
Vice Governor of Misiones Province: Oscar Herrera Ahuad 
Vice Governor of Nenquen Province: Rolando Figueroa 
Vice Governor of Rio Negro Province: Pedro Pesatti 
Vice Governor of Salta Province: Miguel Isa 
Vice Governor of San Juan Province: Marcelo Lima 
Vice Governor of San Luis Province: Carlos Ponce 
Vice Governor of Santa Cruz: Pablo González
Vice Governor of Santa Fe Province: Carlos Fascendini 
Vice Governor of Santiago del Estero: Carlos Silva Neder
Vice Governor of Tierra del Fuego: Mónica Urquiza

Predicted and scheduled events

May
 End of the 2017–18 Argentine Primera División tournament.

November
November 30: 2018 G20 Buenos Aires summit

Unknown month
 Martín Fierro Awards ceremony.
 Superclásico
 Abortion debate over an abortion law bill.

Events

January
January 3: The tariffs of metropolitan buses, trains and subways in Buenos Aires are increased.
January 4: Union leader Marcelo Balcedo, accused of money laundering, is detained in Uruguay, in a joint operation between the Interpol and the Uruguayan police. 
January 6: The economic emergency law ceases to be in force.
January 9: Unable to get support from the PJ and the CGT for an amendment in the labor law, Macri postpones the bill for March. 
January 19: Raúl Zaffaroni, judge of the Inter-American Court of Human Rights, urges President Macri to resign.

February

February 1
 Police officer Luis Chocobar is indicted by the judiciary, accused of murder, for shooting a thief who attempted to kill a tourist. President Macri receives him at the Casa Rosada, giving him his full support. 
 Members of the Argentine Congress propose a bill to ask for the removal of judge Raúl Zaffaroni from the Inter-American Court of Human Rights.
February 2: The government closes the National Lottery, and ends the "Prode" game.
February 7: Minister Patricia Bullrich meets with US specialists in security and terrorism, to discuss the G20 summit. Those people voiced concerns about a presence of Hezbollah in the Triple Frontier. 
February 8
 Members of the Peronist parties Justicialist Party, Renewal Front and Citizen's Unity hold a summit, discussing a joint ticket for the 2019 general elections. The Peronist provincial governors did not attend it, with the exception of Alberto Rodríguez Saá.
 Estela de Carlotto has a private meeting with Pope Francis.
February 9: General strike of national banks.
February 19: Two-days general strike of national banks.
February 21: A general strike is called by union leader Hugo Moyano.
February 22: Six suspected drug traffickers are jailed at the Russian embassy while trying to smuggle drugs in a diplomatic flight.
February 27: Bolivia rejects a treaty of mutual free healthcare with Argentina. 
February 28
 Bolivia reverses their previous decision, and announces a mutual free healthcare treaty with Argentina.
 Union leaders Hugo and Pablo Moyano are indicted on money laundering charges.

March

March 1: Opening of regular sessions of the National Congress of Argentina. 
March 3: The Polish League Against Defamation filed a complaint against the newspaper Página/12, accusing them to violate the recently amended Act on the Institute of National Remembrance, which forbids any suggestion of Polish involvement in the Holocaust. 
March 5: 
Facundo Jones Huala, leader of the Resistencia Ancestral Mapuche guerrilla, is extradited to Chile. 
Former president Cristina Fernández de Kirchner is indicted for allegedly obstructing investigation into the 1994 AMIA Bombing which killed 85 people, allegedly making a deal with the Iranian government to stop investigating Iranian officials involved in the attack in exchange for better prices on Iranian oil.  
March 8: Large demonstrations during the International Women's Day.
March 12: The ice bridge of the Perito Moreno Glacier collapses.
March 13:
 Julio Galván, member of the UOCRA union, is attacked by criminals. He denounced that the attack was carried out by rivals from the union.
 Politicians from all political parties prepare a joint message for Pope Francis, at the 5º anniversary of his appointment.

Births

Deaths

January 5: Antonio Valentín Angelillo (soccer player)
January 11: Noemi Lapzeson (dancer)
January 16: Rubén Oswaldo Díaz (soccer player)
February 6
 Débora Pérez Volpin (journalist)
 Liliana Bodoc (writer)
February 16: Osvaldo Suárez (sportsman)
February 27
 Luciano Benjamín Menéndez (general)
 Hugo Santiago (director)
 Héctor Roquel (deputy)
March 7: Reynaldo Bignone (de facto president)
March 13: Gastón Tavagnutti (dancer)
March 14: 
 Emilio Disi (actor)
 Rubén Galván, footballer (b. 1952)
March 22: René Houseman (soccer player)
July 10: Alicia Bellán (film, theatre actress)
September 7: Julio Blanck (journalist)
October 2: Hermenegildo Sábat (comic book artist)

See also
List of Argentine films of 2018

References

External links
 

 
2010s in Argentina
Years of the 21st century in Argentina
Argentina